Horcasitas is a surname, and may refer to:

 Juan Francisco de Güemes y Horcasitas, 1st Count of Revillagigedo (1681–1766), Spanish general, governor of Havana, captain general of Cuba, and viceroy of New Spain
 Juan Vicente de Güemes Padilla Horcasitas y Aguayo, 2nd Count of Revillagigedo (1740–1799), Spanish military officer and viceroy of New Spain